Oxalis griffithii is a species of Oxalis found in thickets and meadows of Bhutan, China, India, and Japan.

Description
O. griffithii is a perennial that reaches  in height. The scales are strigose. Leaves are basal with a petiole . Trichomes are brown and curled. Leaflet blades are obtriangular, 1–2.5(–4.5) × 1.5–3.5(–5.5) cm in length. It is abaxially pubescent, adaxially glabrous, and the apex is broadly emarginate to subtruncate. Lobe apices are obtuse. Flowers are solitary and nodding. Bracts at middle are flowering stalk, lanceolate, with dense trichomes along midvein and margins. Sepals are lanceolate,  and persistent. Petals aer white with lilac veins, rarely pink (Hubei), narrowly obovate, 1.2–1.6 (–2) cm long. Apex retuse is deeply emarginate. Capsule is oblongconic,  × . Seeds are ovoid, longitudinally ridged.

Distribution and habitat
It thrives in mixed deciduous or coniferous forests, and thickets. It is happy in moist and dry shady places;  in altitude. It inhabits China, Taiwan, Bhutan, India, Japan, Kashmir, Korea, N Myanmar, Nepal, Philippines.

References

External links

griffithii